Withania coagulans ( Sanskrit: Rishyagandha, Tamil: Panneer ilai chedi, Hindi: Paneer phool, Pashto: شاپیانگا/مخازور) is a plant in the Solanaceae or nightshade family, native to Afghanistan, Pakistan and the Indian subcontinent. Within the genus Withania, W. somnifera (Ashwagandha) and W. coagulans (Paneer booti/Ashutosh booti) are economically significant, and are cultivated in several regions for their use in Ayurveda.  It is claimed to help control diabetes. The berries contain a rennet-like protease that can be used to clot milk for cheese production. The plant is prone to leaf spot disease caused by Alternaria alternata.

References

coagulans
Plants used in Ayurveda
Plants described in 1852